Agdenes is a former municipality in Trøndelag county, Norway. The  municipality existed from 1896 until its dissolution in 2020 when it became part of Orkland Municipality. It was part of the Fosen region.  The administrative centre was the village of Selbekken.  Other villages in the municipality included Ingdalen, Lensvik, Vassbygda, Vernes, and Leksa.  The Brekstad–Valset Ferry connected Agdenes to the town of Brekstad in Ørland municipality on the other side of the Trondheimsfjorden.

At the time of its dissolution, the  municipality is the 270th largest by area out of the 422 municipalities in Norway. Agdenes is the 344th most populous municipality in Norway with a population of 1,684.

General information
The municipality of Værnes was established on 1 January 1896 when it was separated from the large municipality of Ørland which originally included land on both sides of the mouth of the Trondheimsfjorden.  The new municipality of Værnes encompassed the area along the south side of the Trondheimsleia and Trondheimsfjorden and it initially had a population of 1,412.  The name was changed to Agdenes on 17 May 1897 by a royal resolution.  The administrative centre was originally at the village of Værnes where the Agdenes Church is located.

During the 1960s, there were many municipal mergers across Norway due to the work of the Schei Committee.  On 1 January 1964, the western part of Agdenes (Ytre Agdenes) was separated from the rest of the municipality and it was merged with the neighboring municipalities of Snillfjord (population: 681) and Heim (population: 724) to form the new municipality of Snillfjord.  On the same date, the rest of Agdenes municipality (population: 858) was merged with the neighboring municipalities of Lensvik (population: 1,136) and the Ingdalen area of Stadsbygd (population: 171) and together, they formed a new, larger municipality of Agdenes.

On 1 January 1995, the Moldtun area (population: 21) was transferred from Agdenes to the neighboring municipality of Snillfjord.  This transfer was approved because the area had been without an outside road connection, and so the only connection was by boat which made it very close to the village of Vernes in Agdenes.  When the road was built, it was built to the west, connecting it to Snillfjord, not Agdenes.  Therefore, it was logical for the residents to vote to change municipalities.

On 1 January 2018, the municipality switched from the old Sør-Trøndelag county to the new Trøndelag county.  On 1 January 2020, the municipalities of Agdenes, Orkdal, and Meldal along with the majority of Snillfjord were merged to form the new municipality of Orkland.

Name
The municipality (originally the parish) is named after the old Agdenes farm, since the first Agdenes Church was built there. The meaning of the first element is unknown (but it is probably the same meaning as in the name Agder) and the last element is nes which means "headland".

Coat of arms
The coat of arms was granted on 30 August 1991 and it was in use until the dissolution of the municipality on 1 January 2020. The official blazon is "Ermine, a chief gules". This means the arms have a field (background) that has a tincture of ermine, a type of fur design that mimics the winter coat of a stoat. The chief has a tincture of red. The ermine field symbolizes the fur farming industry in the municipality. As ermine is also a royal symbol, it symbolises the fact that in historical times the local overlords (jarls) and kings have resided in the village. The red chief across the top was chosen to represent the importance of strawberry farming in the municipality, although another interpretation is to represent the blood from the axe of the 10th-century King Eric Bloodaxe. The arms were designed by Einar Skjervold.

Churches
The Church of Norway had one parish within the municipality of Agdenes. It is part of the Orkdal prosti (deanery) in the Diocese of Nidaros.

Economy
The industrial density of Agdenes is above the national average, and the primary sector is the biggest. Most of the inhabitants work within the milk or forest industry. The growth of strawberries and the breeding of fur animals are important industries as well.

The growth of strawberries has been a major industry in Agdenes for the past 100 years, started by the farmer Lars H. Selbæk in 1886 by planting some strawberry flowers and then giving them away to neighbouring farms. The most common varieties of strawberry grown here are Korona, Sephyr, Senga Sengana, and Bounty.  Today, strawberry collection is performed by foreign workers, which are mainly from Poland and Lithuania. In the initial stages, the Norwegian youth were the main workforce, but after the 1970s, it became less attractive for them to pick strawberries in a field.

Government
While it existed, this municipality was responsible for primary education (through 10th grade), outpatient health services, senior citizen services, unemployment and other social services, zoning, economic development, and municipal roads. During its existence, this municipality was governed by a municipal council of elected representatives, which in turn elected a mayor. The municipality fell under the Trøndelag District Court and the Frostating Court of Appeal.

Municipal council
The municipal council of Agdenes is made up of 17 representatives that are elected every four years. The party breakdown of the final municipal council is as follows:

Mayors
The mayors of Agdenes:

1896–1900: Olaus Tyskø (V)
1900–1919: John O. Bjørgan (V)
1920–1933: Johan Wingan (V)
1933–1934: Anton E. Lystad (Bp) 
1935–1943: Kristian Vatn (V)
1943–1945: Lorentz Bjørgan (NS)
1945-1945: Kristian Vatn (V)
1946–1947: Knut Langnes (Ap)
1948–1955: Thomas Valseth (V)
1956–1957: Arne F. Fjorden (V)
1958–1959: Oskar S. Selvli (H)
1960–1963: Arne F. Fjorden (V)
1964–1967: Arne Utnes (Sp)
1968–1975: Ole K. Tøndel (Sp)
1976–1983: Jens G. Singstad (Sp)
1984–1987: Audun Selbæk (Sp)
1988–1995: Anne Marie Grymyr Sterten (Sp)
1995–2019: Oddvar Indergård (H)

Geography

The municipality is situated at the south end of the mouth of the Trondheimsfjord where it meets the Trondheimsleia.  It includes several islands including Leksa.  The municipality borders the municipalities of Hitra, Ørland, Indre Fosen, Orkdal, and Snillfjord.  The lake Øyangsvatnet is located in the west central part of the municipality.  The Agdenes Lighthouse sits on the edge of the Trondheimsfjord.

Birdlife
The municipality of Agdenes has a rich and varied birdlife. One of the better places is Litlvatnet.  Fully protected since 1983, this nature reserve comprises shallow water with extensive reed beds. The lake is surrounded by farm land, which in its own right provides food and shelter for several species. Formed during the last ice age when sea levels dropped leaving exposed areas of land and trapped water from the melting ice, today's Litlvatnet is a remnant of this.

See also
List of former municipalities of Norway

References

External links

 
Former municipalities of Norway
1896 establishments in Norway
2020 disestablishments in Norway
Orkland
Populated places disestablished in 2020